Hedong Reservoir() is a medium-sized reservoir in Hutian Town, Xiangxiang, Hunan, China. It is the largest body of water and the largest freshwater lake in Hutian Town.

Dam

Function
Hedong Reservoir belongs to the first grade water source protection area and is part of Xiangxiang's water supply network.

The reservoir provides drinking water and water for irrigation and recreational activities.

Public Access  
Hedong Reservoir open to visitors for free. Fishing and hiking are activities around the reservoir.

References

Geography of Xiangxiang
Tourist attractions in Xiangtan
Reservoirs in Hunan